Charles Edwin High (1898–1960) was an American Major League Baseball outfielder.

References

Major League Baseball outfielders
Philadelphia Athletics players
Baseball players from Illinois
1898 births
1960 deaths
People from Oak Grove, Oregon
Burials at Portland Memorial Mausoleum